La Matanza ('The Slaughter' in Spanish) is a partido (county or department) located in the urban agglomeration of Greater Buenos Aires, Buenos Aires Province, Argentina.

History
The origin of the name is uncertain. Is believed to reference a confrontation that Diego, the brother of conquistador Pedro de Mendoza, had with the Querandí tribe in 1536, where he and 22 soldiers that were with him died. This area and the river were named La Matanza (The Slaughter) probably in his name, sometimes using the plural form (Matanzas). The oldest document in which the name of La Matanza appears is dated 29 July 1603.

The partido was named Pago until 1730, then Partido de Matanza y Pozos (Partido of Slaughter and Wells): it was then a largely underpopulated rural area, and was led by a two-mayor system. In 1784, the partido was divided in two into La Matanza and Cañada de Morón (Morón Gully). In 1856, the capital city San Justo was founded.

In the 20th century, its population dramatically increased with the influx of the European immigration first and the internal migration later to the surroundings of the City of Buenos Aires, followed by migrants from neighbouring countries (mainly Bolivia and Paraguay) by the end of the century.

Population

According to the Argentine census bureau, the INDEC, the population was 1,121,298 in 1991, 1,255,288 in 2001 and 1,772,130 in 2010. With an estimate of over 2 million by 2020, it is the most populated partido in the Province of Buenos Aires and the most populated municipality in the country.

Administrative subdivisions
La Matanza Partido is divided into sixteen subdivisions or localidades:
 Aldo Bonzi
 Ciudad Evita
 González Catán
 Gregorio de Laferrere
 Isidro Casanova
 La Tablada
 Lomas del Mirador
 Rafael Castillo
 Ramos Mejía
 San Justo (seat)
 Tapiales
 Veinte de Junio
 Villa Celina
 Villa Luzuriaga
 Villa Madero
 Virrey del Pino

Notes and references

External links

 
 National University of La Matanza
 El1 Digital, a local newspaper

 
Partidos of Buenos Aires Province
States and territories established in 1784